is a Japanese Greco-Roman wrestler. In 2017, he won a gold medal at Paris World Wrestling Championships in 59 kg.

Awards
Tokyo Sports
Wrestling Special Award (2017)

References

External links
 
 
 

1995 births
Living people
Japanese male sport wrestlers
World Wrestling Champions
World Wrestling Championships medalists
Asian Wrestling Championships medalists
Olympic medalists in wrestling
Olympic silver medalists for Japan
Olympic wrestlers of Japan
Wrestlers at the 2020 Summer Olympics
Medalists at the 2020 Summer Olympics
21st-century Japanese people